Bintang Mountains (Banjaran Bintang in Malay) is a mountain range part of the Tenasserim Hills located within the state of Perak, Malaysia. It runs from southern Thailand in the north to the general south of Perak. Titiwangsa Mountains stands to the east of the range. Several of the more prominent peaks that are part of the range are Bukit Bokbak (1199 m), Mount Bintang (1,882 m), Gunung Inas (1801 m) and Gunung Ulu Jernih (1577 m).

See also
 Geography of Malaysia

Mountain ranges of Malaysia
Mountains of Perak
Tenasserim Hills